Nannorrhops ritchiana, the Mazari palm, is the sole species in the genus Nannorrhops in the palm family Arecaceae.

Distribution
It is native to southwestern Asia, in the historical region of Balochistan, from the southeast of the Arabian Peninsula east through Iran and Afghanistan to Pakistan, growing at altitudes of up to 1,600 m.

Description
It is a shrub-like clumping palm, with several stems growing from a single base. The stems grow slowly and often tightly together, reaching  or more tall.

The fruit is a brown drupe. The individual stems are monocarpic, dying back to the ground after flowering, with the plant continuing growth from basal sprouts.

It can be grown in USDA zones 6-11. It is occasionally grown as an ornamental plant in southern Europe and southern North America, but is not widely cultivated.

References

External links

Fairchild Guide to Palms: Nannorrhops
PACSOA: Nannorrhops
Scanpalm Nannorrhops

Coryphoideae
Monotypic Arecaceae genera
Flora of Pakistan
Flora of Iran
Flora of Afghanistan
Flora of the Arabian Peninsula
Dioecious plants